The year 616 BC was a year of the pre-Julian Roman calendar. In the Roman Empire, it was known as year 138 Ab urbe condita . The denomination 616 BC for this year has been used since the early medieval period, when the Anno Domini calendar era became the prevalent method in Europe for naming years.

Events
 Lucius Tarquinius Priscus becomes the legendary fifth king of Rome.

Deaths
 Ancus Marcius, legendary fourth king of Rome (or 617 BC)

References